Dataganj is a town and a nagar palika in Badaun district  in the state of Uttar Pradesh, India.

Demographics
 India census, Dataganj had a population of 21,672. Males constitute 53% of the population and females 47%. Dataganj has an average literacy rate of 50%, lower than the national average of 59.5%: male literacy is 57% and, female literacy is 41%. In Dataganj, 20% of the population is under 6 years of age.

References 

Cities and towns in Budaun district
Blocks in Budaun District